The 1913 TCU football team represented Texas Christian University (TCU) as an independent during the 1913 college football season. TCU did not compete in the Texas Intercollegiate Athletic Association (TIAA) as they had in 1912. Led by Fred Cahoon in his first and only year as head coach, TCU finished the season with a record of 5–2–1. Allen Freeman, who played tackle, was the team's captain and Luther Parker was the manager.

Schedule

References

TCU
TCU Horned Frogs football seasons
TCU football